Coryell Pass is a gap located near Eugene in Lane County, Oregon, United States, near the confluence of the Coast Fork and Middle Fork of the Willamette River. The gap is formed by the river between Eugene's South Hills and Springfield's Quarry Butte. The pass is commemorated by a brass marker located on Franklin Boulevard, on what was formerly the route of Pacific Highway. The marker, which was placed by the Daughters of the American Revolution (D.A.R.), reads "Coryell Pass, Oregon Trail, 1846, Erected by Oregon Lewis and Clark Chapter D.A.R., 1917". The pass was on the southern route of the Oregon Trail blazed by Jesse Applegate and known as the Applegate Trail.

One of earliest ferries in Oregon was operated here beginning in 1847 by Abraham Coryell and his son Lewis. Pioneer Elijah Bristow had passed this way in 1846, and later the Coryells settled there. The site had a spring and was used by Oregon Trail pioneers as a campsite.

See also
Historic ferries in Oregon
List of mountain passes in Oregon

References

External links
Images of the Coryell Pass marker from the University of Oregon Libraries

Geography of Lane County, Oregon
Mountain passes of Oregon